Richard Briscoe Cook (1838–1916), D.D., was a British author most known for his biography of William Ewart Gladstone, The Grand Old Man.

Major works
The Grand Old Man

References

External links
 
 

British writers
1838 births
1916 deaths